Roberta Cleopatra Flack (born February 10, 1937) is an American singer who topped the Billboard charts with the No. 1  singles "The First Time Ever I Saw Your Face", "Killing Me Softly with His Song", "Feel Like Makin' Love", "Where Is the Love" and "The Closer I Get to You", the latter two duets with Donny Hathaway. Flack influenced the subgenre of contemporary R&B called quiet storm, and interpreted songs by songwriters such as Leonard Cohen and members of the Beatles.

Flack was the first artist to win the Grammy Award for Record of the Year in two consecutive years: "The First Time Ever I Saw Your Face" won in 1973 and "Killing Me Softly with His Song" won in 1974.

Early life
Flack was born in Black Mountain, North Carolina, to parents Laron Flack, a Veterans Administration draftsman, and Irene (née Council) Flack a church organist, on February 10, 1937 (some sources have cited 1939 but the 1940 Census gives Roberta's  age as 3 years old). She grew up in Arlington, Virginia.

Growing up in a large, musical family, she often accompanied the choir of Lomax African Methodist Episcopal Zion Church by playing hymns and spirituals on piano, but she also enjoyed going to the "Baptist church down the street" to listen to contemporary gospel music including songs performed by Mahalia Jackson and Sam Cooke.

When Flack was nine, she started taking an interest in playing the piano. During her early teens, Flack excelled at classical piano and Howard University awarded her a full music scholarship.

By age 15, she entered Howard University, making her one of the youngest students ever to enroll there. She eventually changed her major from piano to voice and became an assistant conductor of the university choir. Her direction of a production of Aida received a standing ovation from the Howard University faculty.

Flack became a student teacher at a school near Chevy Chase, Maryland. She graduated from Howard University at 19 and began graduate studies in music, but the sudden death of her father forced her to take a job teaching music and English in Farmville, North Carolina.

Career

Early career
Before becoming a professional singer-songwriter, Flack returned to Washington, D.C. and taught at Banneker, Browne, and Rabaut Junior High Schools. She also taught private piano lessons out of her home on Euclid Street, NW in the city. During that time, her music career began to take shape on evenings and weekends in D.C. area night spots.

At the Tivoli Club, she accompanied opera singers at the piano. During intermissions, she would sing blues, folk, and pop standards in a back room, accompanying herself on the piano. Later she performed several nights a week at the 1520 Club, again providing her own piano accompaniment. About this time her voice teacher, Frederick "Wilkie" Wilkerson, told her that he saw a brighter future for her in pop music than in the classics. Flack modified her repertoire accordingly and her reputation spread. She began singing professionally after being hired to perform regularly at Mr. Henry's Restaurant which was on Capitol Hill in Washington, D.C., in 1968.

1970s

Les McCann discovered Flack singing and playing jazz in a D.C. nightclub. He later said on the liner notes of what would be her first album First Take noted below, "Her voice touched, tapped, trapped, and kicked every emotion I've ever known. I laughed, cried, and screamed for more... she alone had the voice."  Very quickly he arranged an audition for her with Atlantic Records, during which she played 42 songs in 3 hours for producer Joel Dorn. In November 1968, she recorded 39 song demos in less than 10 hours. Three months later, Atlantic reportedly recorded Flack's debut album, First Take, in a mere 10 hours.

In 1971, Flack participated in the legendary Soul to Soul concert film by Denis Sanders, which was headlined by Wilson Pickett along with Ike & Tina Turner, Santana, The Staple Singers, Les McCann, Eddie Harris, The Voices of East Harlem, and others. The U.S. delegation of musical artists was invited to perform for 14th anniversary of African independence in Ghana. The film was digitally reissued on DVD and CD in 2004 but Flack declined permission for her image and recording to be included for unknown reasons. Her a cappella performance of the traditional spiritual "Oh Freedom" retitled "Freedom Song" on the original Soul to Soul LP soundtrack is only available in the VHS version of the film.

Flack's cover version of "Will You Love Me Tomorrow" hit number 76 on the Billboard Hot 100 in 1972. Her Atlantic recordings did not sell particularly well, until actor/director Clint Eastwood chose a song from First Take, "The First Time Ever I Saw Your Face" written by Ewan MacColl, for the sound track of his directorial debut Play Misty for Me; it became the biggest hit of the year for 1972, spending six consecutive weeks at No. 1 and earning Flack a million-selling Gold disc. It finished the year as Billboard's top song of 1972. The First Take album also went to No. 1 and eventually sold 1.9 million copies in the United States. Eastwood, who paid $2,000 for the use of the song in the film, has remained an admirer and friend of Flack's ever since. It was awarded the Grammy Award for Record of the Year in 1973. In 1983, she recorded the end music to the Dirty Harry film Sudden Impact at Eastwood's request.

In 1972, Flack began recording regularly with Donny Hathaway, scoring hits such as the Grammy-winning "Where Is the Love" (1972) and later "The Closer I Get to You" (1978), both million-selling gold singles. Flack and Hathaway recorded several duets together, including two LPs, until Hathaway's 1979 death.

On her own Flack scored her second No. 1 hit in 1973, "Killing Me Softly with His Song" written by Charles Fox, Norman Gimbel and Lori Lieberman. It was awarded both Record of the Year and Best Pop Vocal Performance, Female at the 1974 Grammy Awards. Its parent album was Flack's biggest-selling disc, eventually earning double platinum certification. In 1974, Flack released "Feel Like Makin' Love," which became her third and final No. 1 hit to date on the Hot 100; she produced the single and her 1975 album of the same name under the pseudonym Rubina Flake. In 1974, Flack sang the lead on a Sherman Brothers song called "Freedom", which featured prominently at the opening and closing of the movie Huckleberry Finn. In the same year, she performed "When We Grow Up" with a teenage Michael Jackson on the 1974 television special, Free to Be... You and Me.

1980s

Flack had a 1982 hit single with "Making Love", written by Burt Bacharach (the title track of the 1982 film of the same name), which reached No. 13. She began working with Peabo Bryson with more limited success, charting as high as No. 5 on the R&B chart (plus No. 16 Pop and No. 4 Adult Contemporary) with "Tonight, I Celebrate My Love" in 1983.

In 1986, Flack sang the theme song entitled "Together Through the Years" for the NBC television series Valerie, later known as The Hogan Family. The song was used throughout the show's six seasons. In 1987, Flack supplied the voice of Michael Jackson's mother in the 18-minute short film for "Bad". Oasis was released in 1988 and failed to make an impact with pop audiences, though the title track reached No. 1 on the R&B chart and a remix of "Uh-Uh Ooh-Ooh Look Out (Here It Comes)" topped the dance chart in 1989. Flack found herself again in the US Top 10 with the hit song "Set the Night to Music", a 1991 duet with Jamaican vocalist Maxi Priest that peaked at No. 6 on the Billboard Hot 100 charts and No. 2 AC.

Later career

In 1999, a star with Flack's name was placed on the Hollywood Walk of Fame. In the same year, she gave a concert tour in South Africa; the final performance was attended by President Nelson Mandela. In 2010, she appeared on the 52nd Annual Grammy Awards, singing a duet of "Where Is The Love" with Maxwell.

In February 2012, Flack released Let it Be Roberta, an album of Beatles covers including "Hey Jude" and "Let It Be". It was her first recording in over eight years. Flack knew John Lennon and Yoko Ono, as both households moved in 1975 into The Dakota apartment building in New York City; they had apartments across the hall from each other. Flack has said that she has been asked to do a second album of Beatles covers. In 2013, she was reported to be involved in an interpretative album of the Beatles' classics.

At age 80, Flack made her most recent recording, Running, the closing credits song of the 2018 feature documentary 3100: Run and Become with music and lyrics by Michael A. Levine.

Critical reputation 
Flack's minimalist, classically trained approach to her songs was seen by a number of critics as lacking in grit and uncharacteristic of soul music. According to music scholar Jason King, her work was regularly described with the adjectives "boring", "depressing", "lifeless", "studied", and "calculated"; in contrast, AllMusic's Steve Huey said it has been called "classy, urbane, reserved, smooth, and sophisticated".

In 1971, Village Voice critic Robert Christgau reported that "Flack is generally regarded as the most significant new black woman singer since Aretha Franklin, and at moments she sounds kind, intelligent, and very likable. But she often exhibits the gratuitous gentility you'd expect of someone who says 'between you and I'."

Reviewing her body of work from the 1970s, he later argued that the singer "has nothing whatsoever to do with rock and roll or rhythm and blues and almost nothing to do with soul", comparing her middle-of-the-road aesthetic to Barry Manilow but with better taste, which he believed does not necessarily guarantee more enduring music: "In the long run, pop lies are improved by vulgarity."

Writer and music critic Ann Powers argued in a 2020 piece for NPR that "Flack's presence looms over both R&B and indie "bedroom" pop as if she were one of the astral beings in Ava DuVernay's version of A Wrinkle In Time."  Jason King argued that she occupies a complex place in popular music, as "the nature of her power as a performer—to generate rapturous, spellbinding mood music and to plumb the depths of soulful heaviness by way of classically-informed technique—is not too easy to claim or make sense with the limited tools that we have in music criticism."

Personal life
Flack is a member of the Artist Empowerment Coalition, which advocates for artists to have the right to control their creative properties. She is also a spokeswoman for the American Society for the Prevention of Cruelty to Animals; her appearance in commercials for the ASPCA featured "The First Time Ever I Saw Your Face". The Hyde Leadership Charter School's located in The Bronx, NYC, runs an after-school music program called "The Roberta Flack School of Music" and is in partnership with Flack, who founded the school, which provides free music education to underprivileged students.

From 1966 to 1972, she was married to Steve Novosel. Flack is the aunt of professional ice skater Rory Flack. She is also the godmother of musician Bernard Wright, who died in an accident on May 19, 2022.

According to DNA analysis, she is of Cameroonian descent.

Health
On April 20, 2018, Flack was appearing onstage at the Apollo Theater at a benefit for the Jazz Foundation of America. She became ill, left the stage, and was rushed to the Harlem Hospital Center. In a statement, her manager announced that Flack had suffered a stroke a few years prior and still was not feeling well, but was "doing fine" and being kept overnight for medical observation.

On November 14, 2022, it was announced by a spokesperson that Flack had been diagnosed with amyotrophic lateral sclerosis and had retired from performing, due to the disease making it "impossible to sing", according to a spokesperson.

In popular culture

Flack's collaboration with Donny Hathaway is mentioned in the song "What A Catch, Donnie" on Fall Out Boy's fourth studio album, Folie à Deux.

American experimental producer Flying Lotus had a song named after her ("RobertaFlack") on his Los Angeles album.

In 1991, Hong Kong singer Sandy Lam recorded a cover version of "And So It Goes" called "微涼" on the album "夢了、瘋了、倦了". Although it was not officially promoted by the record company, it was played by many DJs.

In the Red Hot Chili Peppers' song "My Lovely Man", on the album Blood Sugar Sex Magik, Anthony Kiedis sang "I listen to Roberta Flack, but I know you won't come back."

She is a favorite singer of Vic Wilcox, in David Lodge's novel Nice Work, winner of the Sunday Express Book of the Year award in 1988.

In the 2014 Marvel movie X-Men: Days of Future Past, her hit "The First Time Ever I Saw Your Face" is playing when Hugh Jackman's character, Wolverine's consciousness initially arrives back in 1973. The song also appears in Marlon Riggs's 1989 experimental documentary Tongues Untied.

Her song "Compared to What" plays over the opening credits to the 2015 movie The Man From U.N.C.L.E. The song also appears in Paul Thomas Anderson's 1997 film Boogie Nights.

Accolades
On May 11, 2017, Roberta Flack received an honorary Doctorate degree in the Arts from Long Island University.

Flack was inducted into the North Carolina Music Hall of Fame in 2009.

On March 12, 2022, Flack was honored with the DAR Women in American History Award and a restored fire callbox in the Capitol Hill neighborhood of Washington DC commemorating her early-career connection to nearby Mr. Henry's neighborhood bar.

Grammy Awards
The Grammy Awards are awarded annually by the National Academy of Recording Arts and Sciences. Flack has received four awards from thirteen nominations.

|-
| || "You've Got a Friend" (with Donny Hathaway) || Best R&B Vocal Performance by a Group || 
|-
|rowspan="3"|  || "The First Time Ever I Saw Your Face" || Record of the Year || 
|-
| "Where Is the Love" (with Donny Hathaway) || Best Pop Vocal Performance by a Duo, Group or Chorus || 
|-
| Quiet Fire || Best Pop Vocal Performance, Female || 
|-
|rowspan="3"|  || Killing Me Softly || Album of the Year || 
|-
|rowspan="2"| "Killing Me Softly with His Song" || Record of the Year || 
|-
| Best Pop Vocal Performance, Female || 
|-
|rowspan="2"|  
|rowspan="2"| "Feel Like Makin' Love" || Record of the Year || 
|-
| Best Pop Vocal Performance, Female || 
|-
||  || "The Closer I Get to You" (with Donny Hathaway)  || Best Pop Vocal Performance by a Duo or Group || 
|-
|rowspan="2"|  || Roberta Flack Featuring Donny Hathaway || Best R&B Vocal Performance, Female || 
|-
|  "Back Together Again" (with Donny Hathaway) || Best R&B Performance by a Duo or Group with Vocal || 
|-
||  || Roberta || Best Traditional Pop Vocal Performance || 
|-
|  || Roberta Flack || Grammy Lifetime Achievement Award || 
|-

American Music Awards
The American Music Awards is an annual awards ceremony created by Dick Clark in 1973.  Flack has received one award from six nominations.

|-
|rowspan="3"|  |||  || Favorite Female Artist (Pop/Rock) || 
|-
|  || Favorite Female Artist (Soul/R&B) || 
|-
| | "Killing Me Softly with His Song" || Favorite Single (Pop/Rock) || 
|-
|rowspan="2"|  |||  || Favorite Female Artist (Soul/R&B) || 
|-
| | "Feel Like Makin' Love" || Favorite Single (Soul/R&B) || 
|-
||  |||  || Favorite Female Artist (Soul/R&B) ||

Discography

 First Take (1969)
 Chapter Two (1970)
 Quiet Fire (1971)
 Roberta Flack & Donny Hathaway (1972)
 Killing Me Softly (1973)
 Feel Like Makin' Love (1975)
 Blue Lights in the Basement (1977)
 Roberta Flack (1978)
 Roberta Flack Featuring Donny Hathaway (1980)
 I'm the One (1982)
 Born to Love (1983)
 Oasis (1988)
 Set the Night to Music (1991)
 Stop the World (1992)
 Roberta (1994)
 The Christmas Album (1997)
 Holiday (2003)
 Let It Be Roberta (2012)
 Running (2018)

Citations

General bibliography

External links

 Official website
 

1937 births
Living people
20th-century African-American women singers
20th-century American pianists
21st-century African-American women singers
21st-century American pianists
21st-century American women singers
21st-century American singers
429 Records artists
African-American women singer-songwriters
African-American pianists
American contraltos
American women pop singers
American women singer-songwriters
American jazz pianists
American jazz singers
American people of Cameroonian descent
American pop pianists
American rhythm and blues keyboardists
American rhythm and blues singers
American soul keyboardists
American soul singers
American women jazz singers
American women pianists
Angel Records artists
Atlantic Records artists
Ballad musicians
Capitol Records artists
Delta Sigma Theta members
Grammy Award winners
Grammy Lifetime Achievement Award winners
Howard University alumni
Jazz musicians from North Carolina
People from Black Mountain, North Carolina
People with motor neuron disease
Rhythm and blues pianists
Singer-songwriters from North Carolina
Sony Music Publishing artists